The 2018 Sun Belt conference football season began on August 30, 2018, and ended on November 24, 2018. It was a part of the 2018 season of the Football Bowl Subdivision (FBS), the top level of NCAA Division I football. The Sun Belt Conference Football Championship Game was played on December 1, 2018, with Appalachian State winning the inaugural game. The entire schedule was released on February 27.

Preseason

Coaches predictions
The 2018 preseason coaches football poll was released on July 19, voted from the 10 coaches of the conference. Appalachian State and Arkansas State were chosen to be the finalist for their division, with the Red Wolves predicted to win the first ever Sun Belt Championship Game.
East Division
1. Appalachian State (6 first-place votes)
2. Troy (4) 
3. Georgia State
4. Georgia Southern
5. Coastal Carolina
West Division
1. Arkansas State (9)
2. Louisiana–Monroe
3. South Alabama (1)
4. Louisiana
5. Texas State

Season
This will be the first season with 10 teams as the New Mexico State left the conference to become independent and Idaho downgraded to FCS and compete in the Big Sky Conference. The scheduling format for the ten members were reset for the 2018 season. Each member will play eight other members in the conference with four at home and four away. The conference was split up with five teams representing the east and the other five representing the west division. A team will play each team within their division (4 teams) and four from the other division (two at home and two away). South Alabama (west division) and Troy (east) will be the only two teams to play each other every year due to their rivalry and proximity to each other.

Schedule

Regular season

Week One

Players of the week:

Week Two

Players of the week:

Week Three

Players of the week:

Week Four

Players of the week:

Week Five

Players of the week:

Week Six

Players of the week:

Week Seven

Players of the week:

Week Eight

Players of the week:

Week Nine

Players of the week:

Week Ten

Players of the week:

Week Eleven

Players of the week:

Week Twelve

Players of the week:

Week Thirteen

Players of the week:

Sun Belt Championship Game

Postseason

Bowl games

Bowls based on contractual tie-ins. Actual bowls attended by Sun Belt members may vary and will be announced following the regular season.

Awards and honors

Individual Awards
Player of the Year: Justice Hansen, R-Sr., QB, Arkansas State
Offensive Player of the Year: Zac Thomas, So., QB, Appalachian State
Defensive Player of the Year: Ronheen Bingham, Sr., DL, Arkansas State
Freshman of the Year: Marcel Murray, RB, Arkansas State
Newcomer of the Year: Kirk Merritt, Jr., WR, Arkansas State
Coach of the Year: Scott Satterfield, Appalachian State

All-Conference Teams
Offense:

Defense:

Special Teams:

Ref:

Non-conference records

Power Five conferences

Group of Five conferences

FBS independents

FCS conferences

Home attendance

Bold: Exceeded capacity
†Season High

References